West Harwich is a village in the town of Harwich, Massachusetts, on Cape Cod, United States. West Harwich makes most of the population in the Northwest Harwich Census-designated place.

Geography and demographics
West Harwich is in the Northwest Harwich CDP. It is located on Massachusetts Route 28, a major route on Cape Cod and Massachusetts. In the summer West Harwich is a vacation area. In the other seasons West Harwich is still very populated.

Education
Harwich's schools are part of the Monomoy Regional School District. Harwich Elementary School serves students from pre-school through fourth grade, Monomoy Regional Middle School which serves both Harwich and neighboring town, Chatham. This middle school serves grades 5–7, and Monomoy Regional High School serves grades 8–12 for both Harwich and Chatham. Monomoy's teams are known as the Sharks. Harwich is known for its excellent boys basketball, girls basketball, girls field hockey, softball and baseball teams.

The Lighthouse Charter School is located in East Harwich in the former home of the Harwich Cinema.

Harwich is the site of Cape Cod Regional Technical High School, a grades 9–12 high school which serves most of Cape Cod. The town is also home to Holy Trinity PreSchool, a Catholic pre-school which serves pre-kindergarten in West Harwich.[22]

Zip Code and CDP
West Harwich has its own Zip Code (02671), however it is part of the Northwest Harwich CDP area, along with North Harwich and Pleasant Lake.

References

External links
 West Harwich Information

Harwich, Massachusetts
Populated coastal places in Massachusetts
Villages in Barnstable County, Massachusetts
Villages in Massachusetts